Sherluck (foaled 1958 in Virginia) was an American Thoroughbred racehorse best known for winning the 1961 Belmont Stakes and ending Carry Back's chance to win the U.S. Triple Crown.

Background
Bred by renowned horsewoman Liz Whitney Lunn, Sherluck was out of the British mare Samminiato, a daughter of the 1945 Epsom Derby winner, Dante, who in turn was a son of the great Nearco. His sire, Correspondent, was a winner of the 1953 Blue Grass Stakes and the 1954 Hollywood Gold Cup. Grandsire Khaled was also the sire of U.S. Racing Hall of Fame inductee Swaps. Sherluck was conditioned for racing by Harold Young.

Racing career
At age two Sherluck's best result in a major race for his age group was a third-place finish in the Pimlico Futurity. At age three, Sherluck's win in the Blue Grass Stakes under future Hall of Fame jockey Braulio Baeza made him a legitimate contender for the Kentucky Derby. Under superstar jockey Eddie Arcaro, he finished fifth to Carry Back in the Derby and under Sam Boulmetis, he was fifth again to Carry Back in the Preakness Stakes. Going into the Belmont Stakes, Sherluck had won only once in his ten starts that year but, reunited with Braulio Baeza, the colt gave him the first of his three wins in the Belmont, with Carry Back finishing seventh in the nine-horse field.

With Braulio Baeza again on board, Sherluck won October's Lawrence Realization Stakes at Belmont Park, beating Carry Back again. The following month, jockey Bill Shoemaker rode him to victory in the Roamer Handicap at Aqueduct Racetrack

Stud record
Retired to stud duty in the United States, Sherluck was not successful, and in 1970 was sent to breeders in France and then to Denmark in 1975.

References

1958 racehorse births
Racehorses bred in Virginia
Racehorses trained in the United States
Belmont Stakes winners
Whitney racehorses
Thoroughbred family 3-o